Lucky Landing Marina and Seaplane Base  is a privately owned, public-use seaplane base located seven nautical miles (13 km) north of the central business district of Bangor, a city in Penobscot County, Maine, United States. It is located on Pushaw Lake.

Facilities and aircraft 
Lucky Landing Marina and Seaplane Base has one landing area designated 2/20 which measures 15,000 x 4,000 ft (4,572 x 1,219 m). For the 12-month period ending July 31, 2006, the airport had 1,850 aircraft operations, an average of 154 per month: 86% general aviation and 14% air taxi.

References

External links 
KT Aviation

Seaplane bases in the United States
Airports in Penobscot County, Maine
Buildings and structures in Bangor, Maine